Laurence Michael Cummins (January 12, 1889 in Kinsale - March 16, 1954 in Cheltenham) was an Irish long-distance and steeplechase runner.

At the 1920 Summer Olympics he placed 26th in the individual cross country, competing for Great Britain.

Four times he participated in the International Cross Country Championships with following rankings:

 1920: 5
 1921: 7
 1922: 30
 1927: 33

In 1919 he was second in the steeplechase competition of the AAA.

References 

 Profile at Sports-Reference.com (Internet Archive)
 Athletes File at Athchamps (Internet Archive)

1889 births
1954 deaths
Irish male long-distance runners
British male long-distance runners
British male cross country runners
Irish male cross country runners
Olympic cross country runners
Olympic athletes of Great Britain
Athletes (track and field) at the 1920 Summer Olympics
People from Kinsale